

The Thurston TA16 Trojan was a light amphibious aircraft developed in the United States during the 1970s for homebuilding. During the 1980s and again in the early 2000s, efforts were made to certificate the design for series production under the name Seafire. It was a four-seat all-metal flying boat with a shoulder-mounted cantilever wing and a T-tail. The engine was mounted tractor-fashion on a tall pylon above the wings, and the aircraft was equipped with retractable tricycle undercarriage for alighting on land.

Sales of plans to homebuilders were suspended after 32 sets had been sold while initial efforts were made to certificate the design. These proved fruitless but a second attempt in the early 1980s resulted in the flight of a prototype Seafire (registered N16SA) on 10 December 1982. The new entity created to handle the certification and production, International Aeromarine Corporation (IAC), expected the process to be complete by 1987, but this too fell by the wayside, and rights to the design reverted to Thurston with 85% of the process complete. In the meantime, refinements made to the design during the certification trials were incorporated into the plans for homebuilders.

In 1998, a new company, Aquastar Inc was formed to revive the certification project. The Seafire prototype was refurbished and re-registered in 2000, recommencing certification trials in 2002. The Seafire was publicly re-launched at EAA AirVenture Oshkosh that same year, but the project stalled again in mid-2003.

Specifications (TA16 Seafire)

References

 
 
 
 
 
 
 Archived version of Aquastar website

1970s United States civil utility aircraft
Homebuilt aircraft
Trojan
High-wing aircraft
Amphibious aircraft
Single-engined tractor aircraft
Aircraft first flown in 1975
Flying boats